Louis-Joseph may refer to:
Louis Joseph Bahin (1813-1857), American painter in the Antebellum South
 Louis-Joseph de Montcalm (1712-1759), French military commander 
 Prince Louis-Joseph of France (1781-1789), son of Louis XVI of France
 Louis-Joseph Papineau (1786-1871), Canadian politician 

Compound given names